The list of Arkansas state high school track and field champions is based on the annual winner of the team competition at the state track and field meet held annually each spring by the Arkansas Activities Association.

List of Arkansas state high school boys track and field champions 
Little Rock Central holds the national record for all-time most state championships in boys track and field with 50 titles won between 1908 and 1979. 

 2017 – Bentonville (2), Texarkana (12), De Queen (8), Heber Springs (9), Prescott (9), Caddo Hills (4), Trinity Christian (5)
 2016 – Fayetteville (3), Texarkana (11), Forrest City (6), Heber Springs (8), Genoa Central (2), Lafayette County (2), Jacksonville Lighthouse 
 2015 – Bryant, Texarkana (10), Magnolia (7), Heber Springs (7), Prescott (8), Junction City (3), Caddo Hills (3) 
 2014 – Bentonville, Texarkana (9), Vilonia (3), Dollarway (2), Elkins, Junction City (2), Caddo Hills (2)
 2013 – Rogers Heritage, Texarkana (8), Vilonia (2), Heber Springs (6), Episcopal Collegiate, Junction City, Caddo Hills
 2012 – Fayetteville (2), Russellville (9), Vilonia, Heber Springs (5), Prescott (7), Magazine, Trinity Christian (4)
 2011 – FS Southside, Russellville (8), Magnolia (6), Heber Springs (4), Rivercrest, Augusta, Trinity Christian (3)
 2010 – FS Southside, Lake Hamilton, Magnolia (5), Nashville, Rivercrest, Augusta, Trinity Christian (2)
 2009 – FS Southside, Lake Hamilton, Alma, De Queen (7), Prescott (6), Des Arc, Trinity Christian
 2008 – Rogers (2), Lake Hamilton, Magnolia (4), De Queen (6), Prescott (5), Earle, Acorn
 2007 – Rogers, Forrest City (5), Magnolia (3), Nashville, Prescott (4), Mineral Springs, Acorn
 2006 – Forrest City (4), Magnolia (2), Ashdown, Jessieville, Union Christian 
 2005 – Camden Fairview, Alma, De Queen (5), Jessieville, Emerson  (18)
 2004 – Fayetteville, Alma, De Queen (4), Lafayette County, Emerson (17)
 2003 – Russellville (7), Crossett (23), De Queen (3), Stamps, Emerson (16)
 2002 – Russellville (6), Crossett (22), Dardanelle, Mineral Springs, FS Christian (4)
 2001 – Pine Bluff (16), Hot Springs, Nashville, tie: Barton-Clarendon, FS Christian (3)
 2000 – Pine Bluff (15), Hot Springs, Nashville, Mineral Springs, FS Christian (2)
 1999 – LR Fair, Hot Springs, Nashville, Mineral Springs, Emerson (15)
 1998 – Pine Bluff (14), Crossett (21), Heber Springs (3), Mineral Springs, FS Christian
 1997 – Pine Bluff (13), Arkadelphia, Heber Springs (2), Mineral Springs, Lockesburg
 1996 – Texarkana (7), Sheridan, Stamps, Mineral Springs, Crowley's Ridge (3)
 1995 – Camden Fairview, Sheridan, Stamps, Jessieville, Crowley's Ridge (2)
 1994 – Texarkana (6), Crossett (20), Warren, Barton, Crowley's Ridge
 1993 – Texarkana (5), Camden Fairview, Rivercrest, Mayflower, Emerson (14)
 1992 – Conway, Camden Fairview, Prescott (3), Bearden, Emerson (13)
 1991 – North Little Rock, Crossett (19), Heber Springs, Smackover, Emerson (12)
 1990 – Pine Bluff (12), Dollarway, Lonoke, Foreman-Genoa Central, Emerson (11)
 1989 – Conway, Crossett (18), Prescott (2), Hermitage, Emerson (10)
 1988 – Pine Bluff (11), Crossett (17), McGehee, Augusta, Emerson (9)
 1987 – Pine Bluff (10), Crossett (16), McGehee, Stamps, Emerson (8)
 1986 – Pine Bluff (9), Crossett (15), Prescott, Bradley, Emerson (7)
 1985 – Pine Bluff (8), Crossett (14), Earle, Bradley, Emerson (6)
 1984 – West Memphis, Crossett (13) McCrory, Bradley, Emerson (5)
 1983 – Pine Bluff (7), West Memphis, Crossett (12), Nashville, Cotton Plant (4), Kensett
 1982 – Pine Bluff (6), Jacksonville, Camden (6), Nashville, Lewisville, Emerson (4)
 1981 – Pine Bluff (5), Conway, Crossett (11), Dermott, Lewisville, Emerson (3)
 1980 – FS Northside, Texarkana (4), Crossett (10), Luxora, Cotton Plant (3), Emerson (2)
 1979 – LR Central (44), Texarkana (3), Crossett (9), England, Cotton Plant (2), Emerson
 1978 – LR Hall (4), Texarkana (2), Crossett (8), Altheimer, Cotton Plant, Kensett
 1977 – LR Hall (3), Forrest City (3), Crossett (7), Carlisle, Bradley
 1976 – LR Central (43), Forrest City (2), Crossett (6), Smackover
 1975 – tie: Pine Bluff (4)–LR Central (42), Forrest City, Crossett, Carlisle, Murfreesboro
 1974 – Pine Bluff (3), West Memphis, Camden (5), Pulaski Robinson (4), Danville
 1973 – LR Hall (2), West Memphis, Camden (4), Pulaski Robinson (3), Danville
 1972 – LR Central (41), Hot Springs, Magnolia, Pulaski Robinson (2), Mineral Springs
 1971 – Pine Bluff (2), Benton, Russellville (5), Pulaski Robinson, Gould 
 1970 – LR Central (40), Jacksonville, Russellville (4), Rison, Shawnee 
 1969 – FS Northside, Crossett (5), FS St. Annes, Foreman
 1968 – LR Central (39), Crossett (4), De Queen (2), Stamps (4)
 1967 – LR Central (38), Crossett (3), Fordyce (2), Stamps (3)
 1966 – LR Hall, Russellville (3), Eudora, Stamps (2)
 1965 – LR Central (37), Russellville (2), Brinkley (2), Stamps
 1964 – LR Central (36), Benton (3), Brinkley, Harding Academy 
 1963 – LR Central (35), Conway (5), McGehee, Hughes (4)
 1962 – LR Central (34), Benton (2), Searcy, Murfreesboro 
 1961 – LR Central (33), Benton, Ashdown, Hughes (3)
 1960 – LR Central (32), Conway (4), Fordyce (2), Hughes (2)
 1959 – Texarkana, Crossett (2), Fordyce, Hughes 
 1958 – LR Central (31), Crossett, De Queen, Atkins (6)
 1957 – Little Rock (30), Conway (3), Lonoke, Clarendon (3)
 1956 – Little Rock (29), Smackover (2), Helena, Clarendon (2)
 1955 – Little Rock (28), Smackover, Clarendon
 1954 – Little Rock (27), Conway (2), Atkins (5)
 1953 – Little Rock (26), Conway, Dumas
 1952 – Little Rock (25), Lake Village (3), Camden (4)
 1951 – Little Rock (24), Russellville, Atkins (4)
 1950 – Little Rock (23), Camden (3), Atkins (3)
 1949 – Little Rock (22), Camden (2), Hartford 
 1948 – Camden, Atkins (2)
 1947 – Little Rock (21), Atkins
 1946 – Fort Smith, Bauxite (2)
 1945 – Little Rock (20), Bauxite
 1944 – No state meet War World II
 1943 – No state meet War World II
 1942 – Little Rock (19), Norphlet
 1941 – Little Rock (18), Lonoke (5)
 1940 – Little Rock (17), Lake Village (2)
 1939 – Little Rock (16), Lake Village
 1938 – Little Rock (15), Piggott (2)
 1937 – Little Rock (14), Piggott
 1936 – Little Rock (13), Lonoke (4)
 1935 – Little Rock (12)
 1934 – Little Rock (11)
 1933 – Little Rock (10)
 1932 – Little Rock (9)
 1931 – Little Rock (8)
 1930 – Little Rock (7)
 1929 – Little Rock (6)
 1928 – Little Rock (5)
 1927 – Little Rock (4)
 1926 – Little Rock (3)
 1925 – Pine Bluff
 1924 – Lonoke (3)
 1923 – Lonoke (2)
 1922 – Little Rock (2)
 1921 – Little Rock
 1920 – Lonoke

List of Arkansas state high school girls track and field champions 
The following is a list of the girls track and field state champion schools with the number of titles in parenthesis: 
 2017 – Fayetteville (7), Lake Hamilton (4), Sylvan Hills (3), Pocahontas (4), Genoa Central (4), Quitman, Decatur 
 2016 – Fayetteville (6), Texarkana (8), Magnolia (4), Ashdown (2), Genoa Central (3), Magnet Cove, Trinity Christian (7)
 2015 – Bentonville (7), Lake Hamilton (3), Magnolia (3), Ashdown, Genoa Central (2), Des Arc (3), Trinity Christian (6)
 2014 – Bentonville (6), Texarkana (7), Magnolia (2), Crossett (8), Mansfield (5), Magazine, Trinity Christian (5)
 2013 – Bentonville (5), LR Parkview (2), Camden Fairview (8), Crossett (7), Harding Academy (7), Murfreesboro (3), Trinity Christian (4)
 2012 – Bentonville (4), Texarkana (6), tie – Crossett (6)-Camden Fairview (7), Nashville (10), Harding Academy (6), Des Arc (2), Acorn (2)
 2011 – Fayetteville (5), Lake Hamilton (2), Camden Fairview (6), Nashville (9), Harding Academy (5), Murfreesboro (2), Acorn
 2010 – Fayetteville (4), Texarkana (5), Camden Fairview (5), Nashville (8), Mansfield (4), Murfreesboro, Trinity Christian (3)
 2009 – Bentonville (3), Texarkana (4), Batesville (5), Nashville (7), Mansfield (3), Westside JC (2), Trinity Christian (2)
 2008 – Bentonville (2), Texarkana (3), Batesville (4), Nashville (6), Mansfield (2), Des Arc, Trinity Christian
 2007 – Bentonville, Lake Hamilton, Batesville (3), Nashville (5), Mansfield, Westside JC, Guy–Perkins
 2006 – Camden Fairview (4), Batesville (2), Lafayette County (3), Genoa Central, Union Christian
 2005 – Camden Fairview (3), Batesville, Lafayette County (2), Harding Academy (4), Delaplaine (5)
 2004 – LR McClellan (2), Sylvan Hills (2), De Queen, Lafayette County, Delaplaine (4)
 2003 _ Jonesboro, Sylvan Hills, Nashville (4), Harding Academy (3), Delaplaine (3)
 2002 – Pine Bluff (6), Watson Chapel (5), Mena, tie – Harding Academy (2)-Rison (7), Delaplaine (2)
 2001 – Pine Bluff (5), Watson Chapel (4), Nashville (3), Harding Academy, Delaplaine 
 2000 – Fayetteville (3), Crossett (5), Nashville (2), tie – Jessieville-Shiloh Christian (5), Emerson (7)
 1999 – Fayetteville (2), Watson Chapel (3), Nashville, Shiloh Christian (4), Emerson (6)
 1998 – Camden Fairview (2), Watson Chapel (2), Beebe (2), Shiloh Christian (3), Emerson (5)
 1997 – Texarkana (2), Crossett (4), Mountain View, Shiloh Christian (2), St. Joseph (2)
 1996 – Texarkana, Watson Chapel, Pocahontas (3), Shiloh Christian, St. Joseph 
 1995 – FS Southside (10), Sheridan (2), Pocahontas (2), Barton, FS Christian (3)
 1994 – FS Southside (9), Sheridan, Warren (2), Foreman (2), FS Christian (2)
 1993 – FS Southside (8), Camden Fairview, Lake Village, Foreman, FS Christian 
 1992 – FS Southside (7), Magnolia, Warren, Nevada (2), Emerson (4)
 1991 – FS Southside (6), Crossett (3), Nevada, Caddo Hills (2), Scranton (4)
 1990 – FS Southside (5), Crossett (2), Dardanelle (2), Caddo Hills, Scranton (3)
 1989 – Conway (4), Batesville, Dardanelle, Foreman, Emerson (3)
 1988 – Conway (3), Crossett, Star City (2), Hermitage, Saratoga (3)
 1987 – Conway (2), Wynne (2), Star City, Rison (6), Emerson (2)
 1986 – Conway, Wynne, Fordyce (2), Rison (5), Saratoga (2)
 1985 – FS Southside (4), Alma (3), Prescott, Rison (4), Saratoga
 1984 – Pine Bluff (4), Malvern (2), Fordyce, Lewisville (3), Scranton (2)
 1983 – Pine Bluff (3), FS Southside (3), Malvern, Marvell, Lewisville (2), Shirley 
 1982 – Pine Bluff (2), FS Southside (2), Greenwood, Augusta, Lewisville, tie-Pocahontas, St. Paul
 1981 – Pine Bluff, FS Southside, HS Lakeside (2), DeWitt, Rison (3), Oil Trough 
 1980 – LR Central (2), Blytheville (3), HS Lakeside, McCrory, Rison (2), Emerson 
 1979 – LR Central, LR McClellan, Arkadelphia, Hoxie, Rison, Scranton 
 1978 – LR Parkview, Blytheville (2), Alma (2), Waldron (2), Mountain Pine, Kensett (2)
 1977 – NLR Ole Main, Blytheville, Alma, Stamps, Kensett
 1976 – Fayetteville, Beebe
 1975 – LR Hall
 1974 – Waldron

Most state girls track and field championships

See also 

 Arkansas Activities Association
 List of Arkansas state high school football champions
 List of Arkansas state high school basketball champions
 List of Arkansas state high school baseball champions
 List of Arkansas state high school soccer champions
 List of Arkansas state high school swimming champions
 List of Arkansas state high school tennis champions

References

External links 
 Track/Xcountry at Arkansas Activities Association

Track
high school track